Selkirk/Kindy Airstrip  was located  east of Selkirk, Haldimand County, Ontario, Canada.

References

Defunct airports in Ontario